Timothy Guy Balme (born 18 January 1967) is a New Zealand actor and screenwriter. He's most well known for his roles on the long-running soap opera Shortland Street and Mercy Peak, as well as lead roles in the cult favourites Braindead and Jack Brown Genius. He was a writer and actor on the television series The Almighty Johnsons, and the creator and a writer for The Brokenwood Mysteries.

Personal life 
Balme is married to actress Katie Wolfe, with whom he has two children; daughter Edie (born 2001) and son Nikau (born 2005). Balme also has a son, Sam (born 1987) from a previous relationship.

Career 
Balme graduated from Toi Whakaari in 1989, and his first lead role was in the 1992 film Braindead (aka Dead Alive). Balme and his wife, along with Simon Bennett and Robyn Malcolm, founded the New Zealand Actors' Company, which ran for three productions before being dissolved. An actor for the better part of twenty years, he has recently branched out into writing, and has scripted episodes for television series such as Diplomatic Immunity and Outrageous Fortune. Balme also wrote the short film Redemption, directed by his wife, which was selected as part of the short film line-up at the Sundance Film Festival for 2011.

Balme worked as the head of development for South Pacific Pictures for three years before returning to freelancing. He currently writes for shows such as the popular Channel 7 drama 800 Words and is head writer for the murder mystery series The Brokenwood Mysteries. In 2015 he won the Best Television Screenplay award at the SWANZ (NZ Writer's Guild Awards) for Brokenwood Ep 2 "Sour Grapes".

Filmography

Film

Television

Theatre

Other work

Film

Television 
The numbers in writing credits refer to the number of episodes.

Awards and nominations

References

External links

TVNZ Tim Balme page

1967 births
Living people
Toi Whakaari alumni
New Zealand male television actors
New Zealand male soap opera actors
20th-century New Zealand male actors
21st-century New Zealand male actors
New Zealand television producers
New Zealand television writers